State Route 284 (SR 284) is a south–north state highway located in the northeastern part of the U.S. state of Georgia. The route's routing is in Hall and White counties.

Route description
SR 284 begins at an intersection with SR 11 Business (NE Cleveland Highway) in Gainesville. The route heads southeast to an intersection with US 129/SR 11 (Limestone Parkway NE) just before leaving the city. Just after this intersection, SR 284 curves to the northeast, along Clarks Bridge Road. A short distance northeast of Gainesville, the road crosses the Chattahoochee River arm of Lake Lanier. The route continues northeast until it meets Glade Farm Road. There, it curves to the northwest to an intersection with SR 52 (Lula Road) south of Clermont. SR 284 continues north into Clermont, where it has a second intersection with US 129/SR 11 (here known as Cleveland Highway). In downtown, SR 284 has a very brief concurrency with SR 283. Just north of downtown, the highway meets SR 254 (Main Street). After this intersection, the route then heads northwest. Just east of Walker Mountain Lake is a very short section of the road that straddles the Hall-White County line. SR 284 veers back into Hall County proper before crossing into White County. Shortly after entering White County, the route meets its northern terminus, an intersection with SR 115.

History

Major intersections

See also

References

External links

 

284
Transportation in Hall County, Georgia
Transportation in White County, Georgia